Doug Satcher is a former professional American football player who played linebacker for three seasons for the Boston Patriots

References

1945 births
American football linebackers
Boston Patriots players
Southern Miss Golden Eagles football players
Living people
American Football League players
People from Jones County, Mississippi